Jordan Hill Roman Temple is a Romano-Celtic temple and Roman ruin situated on Jordan Hill above Bowleaze Cove in the eastern suburbs of Weymouth in Dorset, England. Original amateur archaeological excavations on the site were carried out by J. Medhurst in 1843-6. Some of the finds from the excavations in the 1930s are in the Dorset Museum and the British Museum. There are other Roman sites nearby including Preston Roman Villa to the north west.

Temple
This is a Romano-British type temple, with a square-plan building situated within a courtyard or precinct. The floorplan of the temple measured . The surrounding precinct measured  and contained numerous deposits of animal bones, ceramics, and coins. The site may also have served as a late 4th-century signal station.  The temple does not have an ambulatory but this is probably due to stone robbing. The site also includes a cemetery containing both cremations and inhumations.

Preservation and public access 
The site was entrusted into the care of the State in 1933 initially cared for by the Ministry of Works and now in the guardianship of English Heritage who open it to the public with free access. The site was designated a Scheduled Monument in 1981. There are views from the site across Bowleaze Cove.

See also
 The nearby Osmington White Horse
Religion in ancient Rome
Roman Temple
Romano-Celtic Temple

References

Bibliography
 Ministry of Works, 1952. Ancient Monuments of Southern England. London: HMSO.
 Rev. E.V. Tanner, 1969. Romano-Celtic Settlement on Jordan Hill near Weymouth, Dorset
 Woodward, A. 1992. Shrines and Sacrifice (English Heritage). London: Batsford. pp79

External links

 Bowleaze & Jordan Hill Local History
 History, excavation and research information: English Heritage

1st-century Roman temples
Ancient Roman temples
Roman religious sites in England
History of Dorset
English Heritage sites in Dorset
Tourist attractions in Weymouth, Dorset
Archaeological sites in Dorset
Geoglyphs
Temples in England